Obscurior niasiensis is a moth of the family Erebidae first described by Michael Fibiger in 2010. It is known from Sumatra in Indonesia.

The wingspan is about 9 mm. The head, patagia, anterior part of the tegulae, prothorax, basal part of the costa and costal part of the medial area are blackish brown. The costal-medial area  is quadrangular. The forewing ground colour is light brown. The medial and subterminal area are dark brown and the fringes are basally beige, but outwards dark brown. All crosslines are indistinct and brown. The terminal line is marked by brown interneural dots. The hindwing is grey. The underside of the forewing and costal part of the hindwing are brown, while the hindwing is otherwise grey, with an indistinct discal spot.

References

Micronoctuini
Taxa named by Michael Fibiger
Moths described in 2010